Eduardo de Jesús Blandón Morales (born 12 November 1985) is a Colombian football player. He is a goalkeeper currently playing for Deportes Quindío in the Categoría Primera B.

After a great Sudamericana tournament in 2007, Atlético Nacional bought him to replace David Ospina that was transferred to play in France.

External links
 BDFA profile 

1985 births
Living people
People from Córdoba Department
Colombian footballers
Colombian expatriate footballers
Categoría Primera A players
Categoría Primera B players
Envigado F.C. players
Ferro Carril Oeste footballers
Millonarios F.C. players
Atlético Nacional footballers
Boyacá Chicó F.C. footballers
América de Cali footballers
Deportes Quindío footballers
Expatriate footballers in Argentina
Association football goalkeepers